"Hurt Somebody" is a song by American singer-songwriter Noah Kahan, released on September 15, 2017, as the lead single from his extended play of the same name. The song was written by Kahan and Scott Harris in Nashville and was recorded with Joel Little in Los Angeles. Kahan told Billboard: "'Hurt Somebody' is about the paralyzing fear of not being able to cut loose ends – even if it's ultimately for the greater good. Ending things can be painful, and 'Hurt Somebody' illuminates the inner dialogue of trying to stomach the weight of that decision."

A duet version with American singer Julia Michaels was released on January 12, 2018.

Reception
Nic Kelly from Project U said: "It has that instantly addictive feeling to it. It's simple, understated and melodically perfect."

Mitch Mosh from Atwood Magazine, in a review of the EP, wrote: "Originally released as a solo performance, Michaels' presence adds new perspective, harmony and vision to an already-intense song about the fear of cutting loose ends." It was featured in the 2018 movie The Darkest Minds.

Track listing

Charts

Weekly charts

Year-end charts

Certifications

Release history

References

2018 singles
Julia Michaels songs
2017 singles
2017 songs
Song recordings produced by Joel Little
Songs written by Scott Harris (songwriter)
Songs written by Noah Kahan